Bakriyya or Bakrism (Arabic: البكرية al-bakriyya, adjective form Bakri) is an Islamic term that was historically used by Shia clerics to refer to the followers of Abu Bakr, and is still used by many Shia to refer to the Sunnis.

Among those who used the term were Ibn Babawayh, Al-Shaykh Al-Mufid, Shaykh Tusi, and others.

References 

Islamic terminology